St Mary's Gaelic Football Club, Granemore, usually known as Granemore GFC, is a Gaelic Athletic Association club situated about seven miles south of Armagh, in County Armagh, Northern Ireland. The club, a member of Armagh GAA, fields Gaelic football teams at Under 10, 12, 14, 16 and Minor levels as well as Senior and 'B'. The senior team currently participates in the Armagh Senior Football Championship and the Division 1A League.

Granemore belongs to the Parish of Cill Chluana, along with their neighbours Ballymacnab and Clady.

History
Football has been played in the Granemore area since 1884 and Granemore GFC was established in 1949 at the initiative of Paddy Conroy and Mickey O'Neill, who remained involved with the club over several decades. Granemore first won the Armagh Junior Championship in 1971, and won it again in 1990 and 1998. The Granemore senior team won the Intermediate Championship in 1991, and again in 2005, defeating Whitecross. The club also won the U-16 County Championship in 2002.

In the early 2000s Granemore Minors won the mid-Armagh Championship, the all County Minor championship and the Division 1 league. In 2004 the Under 14s won the Mid Armagh Championship, and in 2005 the club had six representatives on the Armagh Minor team which won the Ulster Minor Football Championship.

Armagh Senior Football Championship (3)
1994, 2003, 2023,

Achievements
 Armagh Intermediate Football Championship: (2)
 1991, 2005
 Armagh Junior Football Championship: (3)
 1971, 1990, 1998
 Armagh Minor All County Football Championship: (1)
 2004
 Armagh Under-16 All County Football Championship: (1)
 2002

Notable players
 Charlie Doyle
 Kieran Toner
 Tony Mc Clelland 
 Caolan Rafferty
 Ryan Rafferty
 Padraig Hollywood
 Anthony “Bomber” Mullen

External links
Granemore page on Armagh GAA website

Gaelic games clubs in County Armagh
Gaelic football clubs in County Armagh
1949 establishments in Northern Ireland